Epicephala subtilis is a moth of the family Gracillariidae. It is known from Tamil Nadu, India.

References

Epicephala
Moths of Asia
Moths described in 1922